The Claretians, officially named the Congregation of Missionary Sons of the Immaculate Heart of the Blessed Virgin Mary (abbreviated CMF), is a Catholic clerical religious congregation of Pontifical Right for men headquartered in Rome. It was founded in July 16, 1849 by Fr. Antonio María Claret y Clará, C.M.F. They are active as  missionaries worldwide, in 70 countries on five continents. The number of Claretian priests and brothers is at more than 3,000. The Congregation has a particular devotion to the Immaculate Heart of Mary and members have published extensively in Mariology.

History

The Congregation of the "Missionary Sons of the Immaculate Heart of Mary" was founded by Anthony Mary Claret on July 16, 1849, at the seminary in Vic, in the province of Barcelona, Catalonia, Spain.

Claret had been thinking for a long time about preparing priests to proclaim the Gospel and bring together a group of priests who shared his vision to accomplish the work he could not do alone. Through his missionary work in Catalonia and the Canary Islands he was convinced that people needed to be evangelized and there were not enough priests who were sufficiently prepared or zealous enough for this mission. Only 20 days after the CMF's founding, Claret received news of his appointment as Archbishop of Cuba, which he accepted despite his reluctance. The Congregation was left under the guidance of one of the co-founders, Esteban Sala, who died in 1858. Another co-founder, José Xifré, took over the directorship. Under his leadership the Congregation established its first mission in Equatorial Guinea.

With the coming of the Revolution of 1868, the Congregation was suppressed by the state and all the Missionaries had to seek refuge in France. Archbishop Claret also went into exile there.  He played a major role editing the Constitutions, which the Holy See approved on February 11, 1870, only a few months before his death.  At this time the institute had its first martyr, Francisco Crusats. Archbishop Claret, the founder, had the great satisfaction of seeing new foundations established throughout Spain, as well as in Africa (Argel), and in Latin America in México, Chile, and also, in the Philippines.

The missionaries often faced extreme hardships. Of the eleven that made up the first expedition to Cuba all but two died a few days after arriving on the island. During the Mexican Revolution, Andres Sola died a martyr; and in the Spanish Civil War, 270 missionary priests, brothers and students were killed. Among them are the "51 Blessed Martyrs of Barbastro", members of the Claretian community at the seminary in Barbastro, Spain who were executed in August 1936, including nine priests and five brothers. Two were spared as they were foreigners from Argentina. These 51 Claretian Martyrs were the companions of the 18 Benedictine Martyrs of El Pueyo, Barbastro. They were beatified by Pope John Paul II on 25 October 1992, and are commemorated on 25 October. The relics of all fifty-one martyrs are kept at their original seminary in Barbastro, which now functions as a museum and chapel.

From 1949 to 1952 the missionaries were banned in China. In 1973 through the instrumentality of Fr Christian Ihedoro, the Congregation came to Nigeria. In May 2000, Rhoel Gallardo was murdered by Islamic separatists in Mindanao.

Publications
The Congregation has an academic publishing company, Editiones Institutum Iuridicum Claretianum (Ediurcla), based in Rome.
Their  journal Commentarium pro Religiosis has been appearing since 1920, from 1935 as Commentarium pro Religiosis et Missionariis (abbreviated CRM, ISSN 1124-0172).

A number of Claretian publishing houses are united in the Claret Publishing Group,  including Misioneros Claretianos  (Sevilla), Editorial Claretiana (Buenos Aires), Misioneros Claretianos (Madrid), Claretian Communications Foundation Inc. (Quezon City, formerly Claretian Publications, established 1981) Claretian Publications (Bangalore) and Congregation Des Missionaires Claretians (Yaoundé). The Claretians of the United States and Canada also operate Claretian Publications and the U.S. Catholic magazine.

By location

United States

California 

The Claretians came to Southern California by way of Mexico in the early 1900s, working in Los Angeles inner city missions. Since 1908 the Claretians have operated the historic La Iglesia de Nuestra Señora Reina de los Angeles in Pueblo de Los Angeles near Downtown Los Angeles, as well as Mission San Gabriel, one of the original Spanish missions in California.

One noted member of the Claretian community in the Los Angeles area was Aloysius Ellacuria, CMF, born in Spain, who arrived there in 1930. He spent nearly fifty years in various position of the congregation in the American Southwest, but mostly Los Angeles. He became known as a man of deep faith, who touched thousands in his ministry and is considered by many as a mystic. The cause for his canonization is under consideration by the congregation, after hundreds of requests prompted the Roman Catholic Archdiocese of Los Angeles to refer the matter to them.

From 1952 to 1977 The Claretians also served from the Theological Seminary of Claretville and Immaculate Heart Claretian novitiate, on the former King Gillette Ranch in Calabasas, located in the Santa Monica Mountains of rural western Los Angeles County. The Thomas Aquinas College was also here from 1971 until moving to a permanent campus in Santa Paula, California in 1975. The land and structures are now part of Malibu Creek State Park.

The Claretians returned to their original Southern California location, the Dominguez Seminary near the Dominguez Rancho Adobe of Rancho San Pedro, in Rancho Dominguez, California near Long Beach.

National Shrine of St. Jude, Chicago

The national shrine of St. Jude was founded by James Tort, CMF, pastor of Our Lady of Guadalupe Church in Chicago, Illinois, United States. Many of Tort's parishioners were laborers in the nearby steel mills, which were drastically cutting back their work forces early in 1929. Tort was saddened to see that about 90% of his parishioners were without jobs and in difficult financial situations.

In an effort to lift the spirits of his parishioners, Tort began regular devotions to Saint Jude. The first novena honoring the saint was held on February 17, 1929. During the Depression of the 1930s and during World War II, thousands of men, women, and children attended novenas at the shrine and devotion to the patron saint of desperate causes spread throughout the country.

United Kingdom

The community established the parish of the Immaculate Heart of Mary in Hayes in 1912 to offer services to Spanish speaking immigrants in the London area. The parish ministry continues to serve the different immigrant communities that pass through Hayes. Buckden Towers was left by a Mrs Edelston to the diocese of Northampton. It served as the Claretians Junior Seminary until 1965. Parish work was undertaken in the area, especially in the American Air bases at Chalveston, Alconbury and Molesworth. Then in 1969 the diocese of Northampton asked the Claretians to make Buckden Towers a parish under the title of St Hugh of Lincoln. The parish has grown in numbers and the Bishop of East Anglia asked the Claretians to take over the parish of St Neots as well in 2011.  In 1997 the Claretians took over the multi-ethnic and multi-lingual parish of St Josephs, Leyton, Brentwood diocese.

In the Philippines 
After the end of World War II, the Claretians arrived in the Philippines and took over Sta. Barbara Parish, Sta. Barbara, Pangasinan upon the invitation by the late Bishop Mariano Aspiras Madriaga, D.D. of the then Diocese of Lingayen-Dagupan. The first Claretian missionaries in the Philippines were Fr. Raymond Catalan, CMF, Fr. Arcadio Hortelano Martin, CMF and Fr. Thomas Mitchell, CMF. Through the years, the Claretians were able to establish different institutions like Claret Schools of Quezon City and Zamboanga, Claret College of Isabela, Claretian Publications Philippines (now Claretian Communications Foundation, Inc.). Likewise, they managed mission areas especially in Mindanao.

See also
 List of shrines#United States

References

External links

 Claretian Missionaries
 National Shrine of St. Jude
 Claretians Org.
 "The Pope thanks the Claretians for their missionary work", 11 September 2015, News.va
 Vallegas, Gabriel Campo. "Claretian Martyrs of Barbastro" 
 http://www.catholicherald.co.uk/news/2014/10/16/the-saint-who-was-stabbed-in-the-cheek/

 
Catholic orders and societies
Religious organizations established in 1849
Catholic missionary orders
1849 establishments in Spain
Catholic religious institutes established in the 19th century